The Pierre de Laitre, or Pierre de l'Aître is a stone at  above sea level that forms the summit of a wooded sandstone mountain of the same name in the Kemberg massif to the north of the town of Taintrux, in the canton of Saint-Dié, department of Vosges. The mountain overlooks the old cemetery, or l'aître of Taintrux, from which the stone and the mountain take their name.

Description
Pierre de Laitre, the highest point, gives its name to a small sandstone mount in the Vosges mountains, a Triassic sandstone butte in the eroded part of the Kemberg massif dominating the Taintroué valley. The summit is a large sandstone rock that has been separated from the underlying sandstone layers by time and weather.

The inhabitants of Taintrux use the mountain for walking. It is near the town of  Saint-Dié-des-Vosges and close to the Sentier des Ducs (GR355).
There is a gazebo on top of the stone with a protective barrier from which there is a good view over the valley and the village of Taintrux.

Gallery

Notes

Sources

Mountains of Vosges (department)
Mountains under 1000 metres
Mountains of the Vosges